The Cleveland Squash Classic is an annual women's squash tournament that takes place in Cleveland, Ohio, United States in February. It is part of the PSA World Tour.

The event was named "Burning River Squash Classic" from 2007 to 2010.

Past Results

Women's

See also
WSA World Tour

References

External links
2012 Squashsite.co.uk - website

 
2007 establishments in Ohio
Recurring sporting events established in 2007